Blennidus dryas is a species of ground beetle in the subfamily Pterostichinae. It was described by Moret in 1995.

References

Blennidus
Beetles described in 1995